Orange 9mm was an American post-hardcore band from New York City formed in 1994 by Chaka Malik and Chris Traynor after the breakup of Malik's band Burn.

History 
Chaka Malik and Chris Traynor began writing songs together in 1992, releasing an EP in 1994 on Revelation Records. The line-up for this recording included Larry Gorman on drums and Eric Rice on bass. Rice left to play bass for H2O, Davide Gentile joined the band, and soon after, Detroit native Matthew Cross took over on drums.  With this line-up, they began writing material for their 1995 major label release Driver Not Included on East West Records (a subsidiary of Elektra Records). The album was recorded in Los Angeles with Dave Jerden (Alice in Chains, Jane's Addiction) producing.  Additional songs, "Magnet", "Suspect", and a re-recording of "Can't Decide" from the Revelation EP were later recorded in New York City.

Mainstream success 
Following the release of Driver Not Included, Orange 9mm toured the US with Helmet, Quicksand, Korn, and Deftones; they were also featured on the first Airwalk Sno-Core Tour.  Later, they toured Europe with Biohazard, and were on the bill for three shows with the Offspring.

With Warner Music Group (the parent company of Elektra and Atlantic) consolidations, Orange 9mm moved to Atlantic Records. During the writing sessions for what would become their second full-length, Davide Gentile left the band to pursue audio engineering. Orange 9mm's second full-length, Tragic, was recorded in New York City, with Dave Sardy (Barkmarket, Helmet, Marilyn Manson) producing. For these sessions, Chris Traynor played bass. At the end of the initial recording sessions for Tragic, Taylor McLam joined the band on bass (McLam played drums in Traynor's previous band,  Fountainhead). On the first day of rehearsals, McLam offered one of his own compositions, which became the minor hit "Failure". The song was recorded immediately, and included on Tragic.

Two weeks prior to the first tour to promote Tragic, Chris Traynor left Orange 9mm to play second guitar for the seminal New York hardcore/metal band Helmet. The band recruited former Supertouch bassist Chris Vitali to take over on bass, and McLam was moved to guitar.

Orange 9mm toured the U.S. in support of Tragic, with artists including the Misfits, Deftones, Sick of it All, Ned's Atomic Dustbin, Local H, and Clutch, among others, including headlining runs and one-offs with the Sisters of Mercy and Type O Negative.

Post-Tragic era 
Orange 9mm was released from its contract with Atlantic following the end of the Tragic tour cycle in 1997. For the next few years, Orange 9mm would write and record a great deal of material under a wide range of influences.  Periodically, the band would perform one-offs and small weekend runs; during this period they released a split EP in Japan and did a week's worth of shows in that country.

Midway through this creative process, Orange 9mm released a five-song EP, Ultraman vs. Godzilla, with NG Records, an independent with distribution through BMG. The fit between the band and the label seemed a good one; Orange 9mm was given a great deal of room to work on material, and new songs and new sessions kept coming.  Over 15 new songs were recorded in the summer of 1998 in the basement of Taylor's Long Island home, and for a few months this material was assumed to be the foundation of the next record. The music was raw and experimental, incorporating more progressive rhythms, more percussion, and 1970s-era synths and electric pianos.  However, the only piece from these sessions to be finalized and released was the song that became "Alien", which would appear on their third full-length, 1999's Pretend I'm Human. Soon after, bassist Chris Vitali left the band to pursue other interests. Again a three-piece, Malik, McLam, and Cross continued writing.

The band then moved to Los Angeles and worked with producer/programmer Neil Perry to create a more experimental sort of record. They hit the studio in the spring of 1999 and by the summer awaited the release of what became Pretend I'm Human. The album was a stylistic shift from their previous releases, with less emphasis on a hardcore sound with more focus on straight rapping with loops and other electronica ephemera behind it. The guitars even took a back seat and weren't the primary focus.

Upon the album's release, the band toured with added members to help beef up the live sound. But sales were low and by the middle of 2000, due to disagreements among members, the band called it quits.

Present 
In mid-2018, an Instagram account was opened under the name orange9mmnyc. Most of the images are of records or live show images, but this gives fans hopes that "something" might be looming with the band.

Discography

Albums

EPs 
Orange 9mm (EP), 1994 Revelation Records

Ultraman Vs. Godzilla (EP), 1998 Ng Records

References

External links 

VH1

Musical groups established in 1994
Atlantic Records artists
East West Records artists
Rap metal musical groups